Orwell Glacier is a small glacier, less than 0.5 nautical miles (0.9 km) long, which descends steeply from the south slopes of Snow Hills and terminates in 20 m ice cliffs along the south margin of Elephant Flats in the east part of Signy Island, in the South Orkney Islands. Surveyed by DI personnel in 1927 and named by them for the Norwegian transport throughout the seasons 1925–26 to 1929–30. Resurveyed by the Falkland Islands Dependencies Survey (FIDS) in 1947.

See also
 List of glaciers in the Antarctic
 Glaciology

References

Glaciers of the South Orkney Islands